Marcel Ernest Lachemann (born June 13, 1941) is an American professional baseball executive and a former player, manager and pitching coach in Major League Baseball (MLB). As a player, he was a relief pitcher for the Oakland Athletics.

Career
After a three-year stint (1969–71) in the MLB, he became the pitching coach for the California Angels in 1984. Lachemann stayed with the Angels until the 1993 season, when he was named pitching coach of the newly formed Florida Marlins by his younger brother, manager Rene. His elder brother, Bill, is also a longtime baseball coach and manager who served as Marcel's bullpen coach with the Angels.

In 1994, he replaced Buck Rodgers as manager of the Angels.  In 1995, the Angels improved markedly and at one point were 11 games ahead of the Seattle Mariners in August, but suffered a historic collapse and lost a one-game playoff at the end of the season. The Angels never recovered their winning ways, and in August, 1996, Lachemann resigned as manager; it was the closest he ever came to reaching the playoffs as a manager. He later returned to Anaheim as the Anaheim Angels' pitching coach under Terry Collins from 1997 to 1998. In the early 2000s he was the Colorado Rockies pitching instructor, and also served in the Rockies' front office as assistant to general manager Dan O'Dowd from 2003 to 2011.

Lachemann served as pitching coach for Team USA during the 2006 World Baseball Classic and the 2008 Beijing Olympics and bullpen coach for the 2013 World Baseball Classic.

References

External links

1941 births
Living people
American expatriate baseball players in Canada
Anaheim Angels coaches
Baseball coaches from California
Baseball players from Los Angeles
Birmingham A's players
Birmingham Barons players
California Angels coaches
California Angels managers
Colorado Rockies (baseball) coaches
Daytona Beach Islanders players
Florida Marlins coaches
Iowa Oaks players
Lewiston Broncs players
Major League Baseball pitchers
Major League Baseball pitching coaches
Oakland Athletics players
Québec Carnavals players
United States national baseball team people
USC Trojans baseball players
Vancouver Mounties players
West Palm Beach Expos players
Florida Instructional League Athletics players
Anchorage Glacier Pilots players
Susan Miller Dorsey High School alumni